Pustin (also Romanized as Pūstīn; also known as Pūstīn-e Bālā, Pūstīn-e Pa‘īn, and Pustīn Pā’īn) is a village in Arabkhaneh Rural District, Shusef District, Nehbandan County, South Khorasan Province, Iran. At the 2006 census, its population was 46, in 9 families.

References 

Populated places in Nehbandan County